The Centenary Methodist Episcopal Church, South in St. Louis, Missouri is a Gothic Revival church that was built in 1869.  It was listed on the National Register of Historic Places in 1997.

The building is a two-story limestone church linked with a three-story office/service building.  It was designed by Baltimore architect Thomas Dixon and its construction was supervised by local architect Jerome B. Legg.  A three-story brick and stone addition to the west was added in 1924, designed by St. Louis architects Mauran, Russell & Crowell.

References

Churches completed in 1869
Gothic Revival church buildings in Missouri
Landmarks of St. Louis
Churches on the National Register of Historic Places in Missouri
1869 establishments in Missouri
National Register of Historic Places in St. Louis
Downtown West, St. Louis
Tourist attractions in St. Louis
Buildings and structures in St. Louis